The Cool & Cool presents Haier Super 8 T20 Cup 2015 was the fourth season of the Haier Super 8 T20 Cup. It was played between May 11, 2015, and May 18, 2015, at the Iqbal Stadium in Faisalabad.

Sialkot Stallions won the 2015 Super 8 T20 by 74 runs. They beat Lahore Lions in the final.

Venue
All of the matches in the tournament will be played at Iqbal Stadium, Faisalabad.

Teams
 Abbottabad Falcons captain : Junaid Khan
 Faisalabad Wolves captain : Misbah Ul Haq
 Karachi Dolphins captain : Mohammad Sami
 Lahore Lions captain : Kamran Akmal
 Multan Tigers captain : Gulraiz Sadaf
 Peshawar Panthers captain : Zohaib Khan
 Rawalpindi Rams captain : Sohail Tanveer
 Sialkot Stallions captain : Shoaib Malik

Fixtures and results
All times shown are in Pakistan Standard Time (UTC+05).

Group stage

Group A
Points Table

Group B
Points Table

Knockout stage

Semi-finals
1st Semi-final

2nd Semi-final

Final

References

2015 in Pakistani cricket
Domestic cricket competitions in 2014–15
2015 Super 8 Twenty20 Cup
Pakistani cricket seasons from 2000–01
May 2015 sports events in Pakistan